Satu Maarit Anneli Salonen (born February 27, 1973 in Vahto) is a Finnish former cross-country skier who competed from 1993 to 2005. She won a bronze medal at the 4 × 5 km relay in the 1997 FIS Nordic World Ski Championships and had her best finish of 12th in the 5 km event at those same championships.

Salonen's best individual finish at the Winter Olympics was seventh in the 10 km at Salt Lake City in 2002. Her best individual finishes was second twice in Finland (2001, 2005).

Cross-country skiing results
All results are sourced from the International Ski Federation (FIS).

Olympic Games

World Championships
 1 medal – (1 bronze)

World Cup

Season standings

Team podiums
 4 podiums 

Note:   Until the 1999 World Championships, World Championship races were included in the World Cup scoring system.

References

External links

1973 births
Living people
People from Rusko
Finnish female cross-country skiers
Cross-country skiers at the 1998 Winter Olympics
Cross-country skiers at the 2002 Winter Olympics
FIS Nordic World Ski Championships medalists in cross-country skiing
Sportspeople from Southwest Finland